Carac may refer to

 a trade name of the drug Fluorouracil
 a sweet pie specialty of Swiss origin, see Carac (pastry)